Arnold Johnson may refer to:

 Arnold Johnson (actor) (1921–2000), American actor
 Arnold Johnson (industrialist) (1906–1960), American industrialist, businessman and owner of the Kansas City Athletics baseball club
 Arnold Johnson (musician) (1893–1975), American big band pianist, arranger, composer and leader
 Arnold Johnson (physician) (1916–2006), Canadian cardiologist